Anthony Kelly (born 1964) is an Australian martial artist and world record holder. Often called the "Arrow Catcher", and referred to as a ninja, Kelly is renowned for his fast reflexes, in particular his ability to catch fast moving items. He has made numerous television appearances.

Training
Kelly became interested in martial arts as a child after watching fights by Bruce Lee and Muhammad Ali. He started training in martial arts in 1978, and states he has black belts in 21 different styles. Kelly started catching arrows at his annual martial arts night in 2000, getting the idea from watching the feat performed in the film The Last Dragon.

Guinness world records
By 2009, Kelly was Australia's most successful Guinness World Records holder, with 18 titles including the record for the most arrows caught in 2 minutes which he obtained in 2001, catching 10 whilst standing 13 metres from the archer, and the record for the most paintballs caught in 2 minutes whilst blindfolded which he obtained in 2003, catching 11. In 2010, Kelly broke the world record for the most tennis balls caught in one minute live on the Guinness World Records television series, Australia Smashes Guinness World Records, catching 43. That year he also broke the record for most tennis balls caught in one minute whilst blindfolded, catching 11.

By February 2012, Kelly had obtained 29 world records, and had 3 still pending approval. On 'Guinness World Records Day' in November 2012 he obtained the record for the most targets hit by a blowgun in 60 seconds, hitting 23.

In 2014, Kelly obtained the record for the most coach qualifications across multiple sports, being a qualified coach in bagua, association football, kung fu, mixed martial arts, ninjutsu, qigong, rugby union, rugby league, tai chi and tai chi dao. By November 2021, he had increased his record to 24 coaching qualifications.

Appearances
Kelly appeared in "Ninjas 2", a 2008 episode of the television series MythBusters, in order to test whether an arrow could be caught in mid-air, whether a ninja can deflect an arrow with a sword and kill the archer before they can reload, and whether a one-inch punch could render somebody unconscious. While Kelly is able to catch arrows, he could not do so under full-combat conditions, so the MythBusters declared that myth "busted". Kelly was able to deflect an arrow with a sword and "kill" Adam Savage before he could reload, thereby confirming that myth. Given the amount of force Kelly could generate with his one-inch punch, the MythBusters team declared it is plausible that someone could be knocked out with the punch.

Kelly was the first person to perform live on Guinness World Records television series in both India and China. He has appeared on episodes of Ripley's Believe It or Not!, Stan Lee's Superhumans and Time Warp.

Personal life
Kelly was born and raised in Armidale, New South Wales. He went to school at O'Connor Catholic College. He states he only eats meat and potatoes, and has never eaten fruit or other vegetables in his life. Kelly attributes his fast reflexes to a combination of genetics and his unusual diet. Kelly previously taught kung fu classes at Duval High School.

References

Living people
Australian male martial artists
1964 births
People from Armidale
Sportsmen from New South Wales